Thrissur Pooram is a 2019 Indian Malayalam-language action film directed by Rajesh Mohan, starring Jayasurya and Swathi Reddy, with Sabumon Abdusamad,   Vijay Babu, Sudev Nair, T.G. Ravi, Sreejith Ravi, Manikuttan, Indrans, Sudheer Karamana, Sadiq, Valsala Menon, and Mallika Sukumaran in supporting roles. The film follows the tale of the young ex-goon Pullu Giri in the city of Thrissur. The film is written and composed by Ratheesh Vegha

The film is produced by Vijay Babu under the banner of Friday Film House and was released on 20 December 2019 and the film was a flop at the box office.

Plot
A young boy becomes a juvenile criminal at the age of 10 after he murders his mother's killer. His modus operandi is to stab with a rabies infected knife. After his mother's death, he is raised by an esteemed criminal lawyer of Thrissur affectionately called Vakkeelamma.

In present, Pullu Giri,  a semi retired gangster lives a peaceful life by running his own bottled water company. He is married to Veni and is father to a 3 year old girl. He occasionally has brush ins with the Police as city Police commissioner Moorthy keeps a close eye on Giri. Thrissur city is currently donned by gangsters brothers, Shyam Rangan and Sudheep Rangan, who are gold smugglers and real estate mafias.

Giri gets dragged back into crime when his friend Balettan gets in trouble after renting a car to gold smugglers working for Sudheep Rangan. Sudheep kills Balettan who has gone to request about his innocence. Giri in rage plans and kills Sudheep by faking a road accident.

Shyam Rangan vows revenge on Giri. He along with his friend Teja, orchestrates kidnap of Giri's wife and strip her naked in the busy market. He also burn down Giri's water bottling plant. Veni requests Giri to take revenge for the humiliation.

Giri in retaliation captures Teja and extracts information on the next gold consignment worth 100 crores. Giri captures the gold and smuggles it back to Kerala in a KSRTC bus and kills Teja by wounding his hand by a knife bit by a dog with rabies. Giri surrenders the gold to the police commissioner.

Shyam orders a hit on Giri. A large group of hitmen attacks Giri in his den. Though Giri manages to disarm his attackers he is betrayed by his trusted lieutenant who stabs and leave him to die. Giri 's friends Ali and Murugan find and kill the betrayer while Shyam gets to know Giri is alive.

With his business empire crumbling thanks to the lost gold, Shyam seeks a compromise with Giri on his lawyer's advice . Shyam and his lawyer meets up with a limping Giri in a local tea stall. While they meet and greet, the tea stall owner stabs Shyam as he killed his son in a hit and run case. Giri then leaves Shyam to die thus saving his family and resumes his peaceful life.

Cast

 Jayasurya as "Pullu" Giri
 Swathi Reddy as Veni
 Sabumon Abdusamad as Shyam Rangan
 Vijay Babu as Commissioner Moorthy IPS
 T. G. Ravi as Vettoly Balan (Balettan)
 Murugan as Sugri
 Manikuttan as Ali
 Sudev Nair as Sudheep Rangan
 Mallika Sukumaran as Advocate Rajalakshmi (Vakkeelamma)
 Sreejith Ravi as Anandh
 Sadiq as George (Sub Registrar)
 Govind Krishna as Rakesh
 Indrans as Murugan (Tea Shop Owner)
 Manesh Krishnan
 Sudheer Karamana as Salim
 Binoy Nambala
 Shaju as Kumar
 Jayaraj Warrier as Paulachan
 John Kaipallil as Teja
 Balachandran Chullikkadu as Jayamohan, Rangan brothers' advocate
 Gayatri Arun as Giri's mother (cameo appearance)
 Valsala Menon as Veni's grandmother (cameo appearance)
 Saiju Kurup as Doctor (cameo appearance)
 Adwaith Jayasurya as Young Giri (Cameo Appearance)

Production
Actor Jayasurya and producer Vijay Babu of Friday Film House were planning to associate together for a number of films after collaborating for Aadu and Aadu 2 and this was announced as a major project in their line up.
The film was touted as a mass entertainer, it was announced to tell its story into several chapters, each named after the various stages of the pooram, such as Kodiyettam and Vedikettu. It was touted as an attempt to deliver a different kind of mass film and do justice to this genre. It was also announced to have all the ingredients necessary for an entertainer. The film was shot in Thrissur, Hyderabad, and Coimbatore. Shoot officially commenced on 15 July 2019.

Music

Ratheesh Vegha composed the background score and the songs in the film.

Release
The film released on 20 December 2019.

References

External links
 

Indian action films
Indian gangster films
Films shot in Thrissur
Films shot in Coimbatore
Films shot in Hyderabad, India
2010s Malayalam-language films
2019 films